Get This in Ya!! is the second EP released by Australian punk rock band the Chats. It was released on Bandcamp on 31 July 2017 and physically released on 30 August 2019. It is the band's last EP before the release of their first studio album High Risk Behavior in March 2020. The EP spawned the single "Smoko", which together with its music video garnered popularity on the internet, accumulating more than 1.5 million YouTube views and almost 500,000 streams on audio platforms.

Critical reception 
Matt Collar of AllMusic gave the album three and a half stars, calling it "youthful, fun and furiously delivered" and citing 'Smoko' the highlight of the EP.

Track listing

Notes
 "Nazi March" is listed as "Left Right" by some online music streaming services such as Spotify.

Personnel

Musicians
The Chats
 Eamon Sandwith — lead vocals, bass guitar, writing 
 Matt Boggis — drums, backing vocals, writing  
 Josh Price — guitar, backing vocals, lead vocals, writing

References

2017 EPs
The Chats albums
Punk rock EPs